Amanpreet Singh is an Indian Shooter. He is from Phillaur, Jalandhar, Punjab who competes in the 50 meter pistol and 10 meter air pistol events. Amanpreet won the silver in Men's 50 meter pistol at the 2017 ISSF World Cup, New Delhi and won the bronze at 2017 ISSF World Cup Final, New Delhi.

References

External links
 Profile at ISSF

Indian male sport shooters
ISSF pistol shooters
Living people
1987 births
Sport shooters from Punjab, India
Shooters at the 2010 Asian Games
Sportspeople from Jalandhar
Asian Games competitors for India